François Bourgoing may refer to:

 François Bourgoing (priest) (1585–1662), Superior general of the Congregation of the Oratory in France
 François Bourgoing (Dominican) (died 1589), prior of the Dominicans in Paris
 François Bourgoing (singer), member of the Oratory of Jesus and author on the plain song in use in his order